"I Apologize" is a song by American recording artist Anita Baker, released in 1994 as the second single from her fifth album, Rhythm of Love (1994). The song peaked at number eight on the US Billboard Hot R&B Singles chart and number 74 on the Billboard Hot 100. It won her a Grammy Award for Best Female R&B Vocal Performance.

Critical reception
British magazine Music Week gave the song three out of five, writing, "Baker goes jungle? But her strong vocals retain the original feel of these tracks, creating a soulful jungle splice-up." Chuck Campbell from Knoxville News Sentinel felt that here, the singer "glides into the subtlety of a more refined arrangement". Jonathan Bernstein from Spin declared it as "a request-line perennial-in-the-making".

Charts

Weekly charts

Year-end charts

References

External links
 www.AnitaBaker.com

1994 singles
1994 songs
Anita Baker songs
Songs written by Gordon Chambers
Songs written by Barry Eastmond
Songs written by Anita Baker
Contemporary R&B ballads
Soul ballads
1990s ballads